Ren (meaning "co-humanity" or "humaneness") is the Confucian virtue denoting the good quality of a virtuous human when being altruistic. Ren is exemplified by a normal adult's protective feelings for children. It is considered the outward expression of Confucian ideals.

Yan Hui, one of the Four Sages, once asked his master to describe the rules of ren. Confucius replied, "One should see nothing improper, hear nothing improper, say nothing improper, do nothing improper." Confucius also defined ren in the following way: "wishing to be established himself, seeks also to establish others; wishing to be enlarged himself, he seeks also to enlarge others." Confucius also said, "Ren is not far off; he who seeks it has already found it." Ren is close to man and never leaves him.

Gang Xu more specifically defined ren as "empathy", as elaborated by Confucius that "So, a man of Ren helps others become established if he desires to establish himself, and helps others reach their goals if he desires to reach his. Being able to make analogies between his own situations and those of others around him could be called the approach to Ren."

Interpretation of the Chinese character 
The single logogram for ren is a composite of two distinct common hanzi, 人 (man, a man, a person) and 二 (two), with 人 assuming its common form inside another character, to which various interpretations have been assigned. One often hears that ren means "how two people should treat one another". While such folk etymologies are common in discussions of Chinese characters, they are often misleading. In the case of ren - usually translated as "benevolence" or "humaneness" - Humaneness is Human-ness, the essence of being human. For Confucius, the interaction of a completely dependent infant and caring parent is the most emotionally charged human interaction, "To love a thing means wanting it to live...". The Way of humaneness is human interaction and through shared experience knowing one's family." Fan Chi asked about humaneness. The Master said it is loving people. Fan Chi asked about wisdom. The Master said it is knowing people". In other words, human love and interaction is the source of humaneness, the source of the human self. Another common interpretation of the graphical elements is Man or a man connecting Heaven and Earth.

Pre-imperial epigraphic sources testify to alternative writings of the same character: 忎 (given as a variant of 仁 in the Shuowen dictionary), 身 with 心 below (⿱身心), and the latter compound with 人 on the right.

The traditional notion about the evolution of character rén however is challenged by archaeological discoveries in the past decades. In 1977, a character rén is identified in the inscription of bronze vessel Zhongshan Wang Ding, consisting of two characters 尸 (corpse) and 二 (two); the vessel dates back to 314 B.C. The earliest extant attestation of the character 仁 was on a bronze vessel unearthed in 1981 and dated to c. 850 BCE, whereon 仁's ancestral form is composed of 尸 "dead body" and 二 "two", the latter of which also signified Heaven and Earth. Xu Gang (徐罡), Ph.D., a member of the Boston Society of Confucius, proposed that "Ren originally denoted a practice of sacrifice and martyrdom where a man of respectable social standing sacrificed himself to defend the societal expectations or code of honor, often in a time of social crisis, to honor the Heaven and the Earth".

Principles of li, ren, and yi 
The principle of ren is related to the concepts of li and yi. Li is often translated as "ritual" while yi is often translated as "righteousness". These three interrelated terms deal with the agency as Confucians conceive it.  Li is the action that has been deemed appropriate by society, yi is the action that is indeed correct, while ren deals with the relationship between the agent and object of the action.  Often li and yi are the same; however, that is not always the case.

Li is the outward expression of Confucian ideals, while ren is both the inward and outward expressions of those same ideals. According to Hopfe and Woodward: "Basically, li seems to mean 'the course of life as it is intended to go'. Li also has religious and social connotations. When a society lives by li, it moves smoothly: men and women respect their elders and superiors; the proper rituals and ceremonies are performed; everything and everyone is in its proper place."

Nature of ren

Traditional views 
Ren relies heavily on the relationships between two people, but at the same time encompasses much more than that. It represents an inner development towards an altruistic goal, while simultaneously realizing that one is never alone, and that everyone has these relationships to fall back on, being a member of a family, the state, and the world.

Ren is not a concept that is learned; it is innate, that is to say, everyone is born with the sense of ren. Confucius believed that the key to long-lasting integrity was to constantly think, since the world is continually changing at a rapid pace.

There have been a variety of definitions for the term ren. Ren has been translated as "benevolence", "perfect virtue", "goodness" or even "human-heartedness". When asked, Confucius defined it by the ordinary Chinese word for love, ai, saying that it meant to "love others".

Ren also has a political dimension. Confucianism says that if the ruler lacks ren, it will be difficult for his subjects to behave humanely. Ren is the basis of Confucian political theory; the ruler is exhorted to refrain from acting inhumanely towards his subjects. An inhumane ruler runs the risk of losing the Mandate of Heaven or, in other words, the right to rule. A ruler lacking such a mandate need not be obeyed, but a ruler who reigns humanely and takes care of the people is to be obeyed, for the benevolence of his dominion shows that he has been mandated by heaven. Confucius himself had little to say on the active will of the people, though he believed the ruler should definitely pay attention to the wants and needs of the people and take good care of them. Mencius, however, did state that the people's opinion on certain weighty matters should be polled.

Ren also includes traits that are a part of being righteous, such as: xìn, meaning to make one's words complement one's actions; lǐ, which means to properly participate in everyday rituals; jìng, meaning seriousness; and yì, which means righteousness. When all these qualities are present, then one can truly be identified as a junzi, or "superior man," which means a morally superior human being. Confucians basically held the view that government should be run by junzi who concentrate solely on the welfare of the people they govern.

Hypotheses regarding the origin of ren and the role of Confucius 
Gang Xu analyzes various remarks on ren by Confucius, examines the earliest Chinese characters ren from archaeological discoveries in the past decades, and reviews the literature that has been rediscovered by scholars in the field. He concludes that ren originally denotes a practice of human sacrifice and martyrdom where a man of respectable social standing sacrificed himself to defend the societal expectations or code of honor, often in a time of social crisis, to honor the heaven and the earth. Confucius transformed the notion ren to "empathy" and rejected insignificant sacrifice in civil services and politics. He used the concept as the pillar of his value system and built a set of standard that is defined, in today's terms, as professionalism.

See also 
Disciples of Confucius
Ubuntu philosophy
Interbeing
Agape
Charity (virtue)

References

Sources
 Chi-Yun, Chang. A Life of Confucius. Hwakang Press, Taipei 171.
 Do-Dinh, Pierre. Confucius and Chinese Humanism. Funk & Wagnalls, New York. 1969.
 Dubs H, Homer. "The Development of Altruism in Confucianism" Apr. 1951: 48-55 JSTOR Oxford University.
 Hopfe M, Lewis and Woodward R. Mark. Religions of the World. Pearson Education Inc: Upper Saddle River, New Jersey, 07458.
 Kong Qiu, lu. "Lun Yu", 5th century.

External links

 Confucius, Internet Encyclopedia of Philosophy, § 6
 Yen Ooi, Ren. The Ancient Chinese Art of Finding Peace and Fulfilment (Welbeck Books) ISBN 9781787398221

Yen Ooi

Virtue
Altruism
Confucian ethics